William Williamson  (1697–1765) was an Anglican priest in Ireland during the 18th century, most notably Archdeacon of Kildare from 1737 until his death.

Boyde was born in County Antrim and educated at Trinity College, Dublin. Williamson was appointed Treasurer of Christ Church Cathedral, Dublin in 1705 and 4th Canon of Kildare Cathedral in 1720. He is buried at St. Audoen's Church, Dublin.

References

1765 deaths
Alumni of Trinity College Dublin
18th-century Irish Anglican priests
1697 births
Archdeacons of Kildare